Tsitre is a village in Kuusalu Parish, Harju County in northern Estonia, on the territory of Lahemaa National Park.

Gallery

References

Villages in Harju County